William D. Snyder  (born September 6, 1952)  is the Martin County, Florida sheriff and former Republican politician who served as the District 82 representative in the House of Representatives of the State of Florida.

He earned his Associate of Arts degree in Criminal Justice in 1976 from Miami-Dade Community College.  He graduated from the FBI Academy at the University of Virginia in 1999 and Florida Gulf Coast University in 2010.

Snyder worked as a police officer at the Miami-Dade Police Department (formerly Metro-Dade) for 20-years.

In 1994, he joined the Martin County Sheriff's Office as a captain and chief criminal investigator.  Snyder was soon promoted to major and became the Director of Law Enforcement for the entire agency.

In 2006, Snyder was elected to the Florida House of Representatives, and re-elected both in 2008 and 2010.  As a representative, he served on the Florida House Appropriations, Criminal & Civil Justice, and Finance & Tax Committees during his tenure. He was elected chairman of both the Judiciary Committee and the Criminal & Civil Justice Committee.

In 2012, Snyder was elected as the 8th sheriff of Martin County, Florida, and subsequently re-elected in 2016 and 2020.

References

External links
Project Vote Smart profile
Florida House of Representatives Profile

Republican Party members of the Florida House of Representatives
1952 births
Living people
People from Stuart, Florida
Florida Gulf Coast University alumni
Politicians from New York City
American police officers
Florida sheriffs